Triple Stamp Records was an independent record label based in Richmond, Virginia. The label was created in 2004 by co-owners Wil Loyal, Christopher Carroll, and Adrienne Brown, and closed in 2013. It had digital distribution through The Orchard.

Bands 
 Anousheh Khalili
 David Shultz and The Skyline
 Homemade Knives
 Jonathan Vassar and The Speckled Bird
 Mermaid Skeletons
 Ophelia

Notes and references

External links 
 

American independent record labels